The Fort Worth Flyers were a  minor league basketball team in the NBA Development League (D-League) based in Fort Worth, Texas. They began play in the 2005–06 season and were shut down for the 2007–08 season.

Franchise history 
In 2005, Southwest Basketball, LLC led by David Kahn was granted permission by the recently rebranded NBA Development League (NBA D-League) to operate four new teams. Southwest Basketball then purchased and relocated three existing franchises while launching one expansion team, the Fort Worth Flyers. The team introduced its logo of a blue capital "F", reminiscent of a biplane, over a basketball.

The team began play in 2005–06 as an expansion franchise. They were the D-League's regular season champions, finishing 28–20, but lost the championship game to the Albuquerque Thunderbirds by a score of 119–108.

The following season, they finished in third place in the Eastern Division with a 29–21 record and lost the Eastern Division semifinal game to the Sioux Falls Skyforce 128–105.

The team did not return for the 2007–08 season as they were not profitable for Southwest Basketball, LLC. There was talk of the Flyers moving to Reno, Nevada, and of the D-League placing another team in Fort Worth, citing their proximity to the Dallas Mavericks. The D-League returned to the metroplex in 2010 with the Texas Legends, affiliated with the Mavericks.

Season-by-season

Notable players
Maurice Ager
Deji Akindele
Kelenna Azubuike 
Jose Juan Barea
Chris Copeland 
Bobby Jones 
Pops Mensah-Bonsu
Jamario Moon
Jeremy Richardson
Luke Schenscher
Ime Udoka
Martell Webster
Louis Williams
Ha Seung-jin

NBA affiliates
Charlotte Bobcats (2006–2007)
Dallas Mavericks (2005–2007)
Golden State Warriors (2005–2006)
Los Angeles Lakers (2005–2006)
Philadelphia 76ers (2006–2007)
Portland Trail Blazers  (2005–2006)

References

External links
Fort Worth Flyers Homepage
Official NBA Development League website
Boston Globe Article on JJB

 
Basketball teams established in 2005
Basketball teams disestablished in 2007
Basketball teams in Texas
2005 establishments in Texas
2007 disestablishments in Texas
Basketball in Fort Worth, Texas